Marius Skinderis (born 13 October 1974 in Panevėžys) is a former Lithuanian professional footballer.

Skinderis has made 16 appearances for the Lithuania national football team.

References

External links
 
 

1974 births
Living people
Sportspeople from Panevėžys
Lithuanian footballers
Lithuania international footballers
Lithuanian expatriate footballers
FK Ekranas players
Expatriate footballers in Poland
Lithuanian expatriate sportspeople in Poland
Expatriate footballers in Ukraine
Lithuanian expatriate sportspeople in Ukraine
Expatriate footballers in Armenia
Lithuanian expatriate sportspeople in Armenia
Expatriate footballers in Latvia
Lithuanian expatriate sportspeople in Latvia
Expatriate footballers in Belarus
Lithuanian expatriate sportspeople in Belarus
A Lyga players
Ekstraklasa players
Ukrainian Premier League players
Armenian Premier League players
Latvian Higher League players
Belarusian Premier League players
FK Kareda Kaunas players
FK Žalgiris players
GKS Bełchatów players
FC Stal Alchevsk players
FC Metalurh Donetsk players
FC Metalurh-2 Donetsk players
FK Liepājas Metalurgs players
FC Naftan Novopolotsk players
FK Sūduva Marijampolė players
Lithuanian football managers
FK Nevėžis managers
Association football defenders